The  International League season took place from April to September 1990.

Rochester defeated Columbus to win the league championship.

Attendance

Standings

Playoffs

Division Series

Championship Series

References

External links
International League official website 

 
International League seasons